"What's your sign?" is a phrase used to ask about someone's astrological sign. It is also considered a cliched pick-up line.

"What's Your Sign?" (or variations) may also refer to:

Music
 "What's Your Sign? (song)," 1998 single by Des'ree
 "What's Your Sign?" a song on the 1975 Harry Nilsson album Duit on Mon Dei
 "What's Your Sign Girl," a song on the 1995 Alex Chilton album A Man Called Destruction

Film and television
 Di che segno sei? ("What's Your Sign?"), a 1975 Italian comedy film
 "What's Your Sign?", an episode of the television series Project Runaway

See also
 "No Matter What Sign You Are", a Diana Ross single